Ilse Huizinga (15 October 1966) is a Dutch jazz singer. She performs throughout Europe.

History
She lived in Australia for a year and attended the University of Amsterdam, where she received a degree in public administration. From 1993 to 1996 she studied music at the Conservatorium van Amsterdam and took master classes with Dianne Reeves and Margriet Eshuis.

Her informal debut was at Ronnie Scott's, and she has also performed at Concertgebouw and Amsterdam's Bijlmerbajes prison. She has toured in Spain, Turkey, Switzerland and France, and regularly performs in the United Kingdom. A winner of the Schiedam Jazz Award, she has represented the Netherlands at the international jazz festival in Vienne, France. In 2011 Huizinga formed Vocal Jazz Trip, a tour operator based in Amsterdam that hosts vocal jazz master classes and jazz themed city breaks in Paris, Berlin, Rome, New York City, Prague, and London. She was invited to several concerts in China and performed with the Orchestra de Jazz do Algarve in Portugal.

JAZZSINGERSACADEMY
For aspiring jazz singers, who like to learn how to scat, how to make the most of lyrics and how to sing jazz – Ilse offers online courses with her initiative Jazz Singers Academy. Her courses are followed worldwide, from the Bahama's to India, from  the US to the UK and from Holland to Taiwan. www.ilsehuizinga.com/jazz-singers-academy/

Ilse currently works on a new show and album.

KLM selected Huizinga's debut album Out of a Dream for its in-flight entertainment program. On Voices Within she recorded her own voice five times. Her third album The Sweetest Sounds was voted Album of the Week on Dutch radio and is played on specialist jazz radio stations across Europe. In 2001 Huizinga recorded an album devoted to the songs of Richard Rodgers entitled The Sweetest Sounds. Her latest album 'Here's To Maya Angelou' is a celebration of the poetry by Maya Angelou, set to music by Erik van der Luijt and received rave reviews from the international press. "Amsterdam siren Ilse Huizinga perfectly seasons the sentiment of Angelou's poetry"

Huizinga's most celebrated collaboration is with her husband, the pianist, composer, and arranger Erik van der Luijt. Other notable collaborations include double bass player Sven Schuster, percussionist Frits Landesbergen double bass player Ruud Jacobs, guitarist Ed Verhoeff.

Discography
 Out of a Dream 1997
 Voices Within  1999
 The Sweetest Sounds (Daybreak, 2001)
 Easy to Idolize (Daybreak, 2004)
 Beyond Broadway (Maxanter, 2005)
 The Intimate Sessions with Erik van der Luijt (Foreign Media Group, 2006)
 The Club Sessions for Japan only – 2006 
 Here's to Maya Angelou (Daybreak, 2016)

Samples
 , "You Stepped Out of a Dream" (Herbert Brown/Kahn), from the 1997 album Out of a Dream
 "Almost Like Being in Love" (Lerner/Loewe), from the 1999 album Voices Within
  of the 2005 album Beyond Broadway

References

External links
 Official website of Ilse Huizinga

1966 births
Living people
People from Beverwijk
Conservatorium van Amsterdam alumni
Dutch jazz singers
Dutch women singers
21st-century Dutch women singers